Stéphane Grenier may refer to

 Stéphane Grenier (soldier), Canadian-French officer
 Stéphane Grenier (tennis) (born 1968), French former tennis player